Japanese football in 1922.

Emperor's Cup

Births
July 18 - Ken Noritake
August 9 - Taro Kagawa

External links

 
Seasons in Japanese football